Ray Lewis is a Guyana-born youth worker in the United Kingdom and a former Deputy Mayor of London.

Career
Ray Lewis is founder and director of Eastside Young Leaders' Academy, a youth leadership development organisation based in the Newham, east London. Other roles have included Senior Advisor to the Mayor of London, Boris Johnson, focusing on solutions to youth crime and mentoring. 

Lewis was educated in a school in Walthamstow. He began his career in the civil service, then studied Theology at Middlesex University. He later worked as a prison service manager at HM Prison Woodhill in Milton Keynes.

Established in 2002, Lewis' charity has become a model of excellence as it transforms the lives of young people at risk of social and educational exclusion. EYLA focusses on leadership skills, supplementary education, aspirational opportunities, family support, health and well-being. There are now 5 other similar projects across the UK based on the YLA model.

Personal life
Born in Guyana, Lewis has 3 grown up daughters. He is a social entrepreneur, life coach and expert in transformational programmes for youth.

References

External links
Eastside Young Leaders' Academy

1963 births
Living people
Alumni of Middlesex University
Politicians from London